Your Son And Brother is a 1965 Soviet drama film directed by Vasily Shukshin. The film is based on Vasily Shukshin's short stories  Styopka  (Стёпка), Ignat Has Arrived (Игнат приехал) and Snake Poison (Змеиный яд).

Plot
An old man named Yermolai Voyevodin lives in a Siberian village. He has four sons and a daughter. They all have different lives. The oldest one - Ignat, moves to Moscow and begins to perform at a circus. He is happy with his life and manages to seduce his brother, Maxim, into coming to the capital. Maxim finds a job as a laborer at a construction site, but constantly feels loneliness. He longs for his village, but he is too proud to come back home. Another son, Stepan, gets into a "righteous" fight and goes to prison. Three months before his official release, Stepan escapes from prison and returns to his village to see his relatives and his homeland and to find strength to serve his sentence, as he calls it. The old man is left with his favorite son Vasily and a mute daughter Verka. Yermolai is very emotional over the breakup of his family and dreams of getting all of his sons together under his roof, but will his dream ever come true? Father blames Ignat for bragging, says that he is playing the fool in the city, calls on to use his strength in his homeland. Ignat does not understand him, he does not want to live in the village.

Cast
 Vsevolod Sanayev as Yermolai Voyevodin
 Leonid Kuravlyov as Stepan Voyevodin
 Anastasia Filippova as mother
 Marta Grakhova as Vera Voyevodina
 Aleksei Vanin as Ignaty Voyevodin
 Leonid Reutov as Maxim Voyevodin
 Viktor Shakhov as Vasily Voyevodin
 Nikolai Grabbe as Nikolai Ivanovich
 Alexandra Dorokhina as Sasha
 Svetlana Zhgun as Nyurka
 Vadim Zakharchenko as doctor
 Olesya Ivanova as Claudia
 Leonid Knyazev as Ivan Egorov, Claudia's husband  
 Svetlana Kharitonova as pharmacist

Awards
1967 Vasilyev Brothers State Prize of the RSFSR (Valery Ginzburg, Vsevolod Sanaev, Vasily Shukshin)

References

External links

1965 films
1960s Russian-language films
Soviet black-and-white films
Films directed by Vasily Shukshin
Gorky Film Studio films
Films based on Russian novels
Films about prison escapes